John Lawson Hargis (born July 3, 1975) is an American former competition swimmer, Olympic gold medalist, and college swimming coach.  Hargis represented the United States at the 1996 Summer Olympics, and was a member of the gold medal-winning U.S. 4×100-meter medley relay team.  He is formerly the head coach of the Pittsburgh Panthers swimming and diving team at University of Pittsburgh.

Biography
Hargis began his competitive swimming career early on in life with coach Paul Blair with the Arkansas Dolphins swim club based in Little Rock, Arkansas.  His stroke specialties were butterfly and backstroke competing in both the 100- and 200-meter distances as well as competing in other events throughout his club swimming career.  After graduating high school Hargis decided to have a collegiate swimming career and chose to attend Auburn University.  While at Auburn, Hargis had several successes ending his collegiate career.  He went to the 1996 Olympic Games for the 100-meter butterfly and also in a relay as well as in 1997, his senior year, leading his team to its first national championship ever. After Hargis' swimming career ended, he married his wife, Lauren and they have two sons and a daughter John, Nathan, and Faith.

Achievements
Hargis has had a number of achievements in both his coaching career and his swimming career.  He was selected as one of Arkansas's 100 Greatest Athletes, three-time Southeastern Conference 100-yard butterfly champion, and a 12-time college All-American.  A member of the 1996 U.S. Olympic team and also an Olympic gold medalist in the 4×100-meter medley relay. He was captain of 1997 national championship swim team and a member of world championship swim team in 1998. After his career had ended Hargis was nominated and inducted into Arkansas Swimming Hall of Fame in 2001.

Olympics
Hargis qualified for the U.S. Olympic trials in 1996 and went on to compete in the meet at the age of 21 years.  He went into the meet like any other athlete, not a favorite of any sort.  He advanced to the finals and won the Olympic Trials in the 100-meter butterfly in the time of 53.42. Once at the Games, Hargis qualified for B Finals with a time of 54.06. In the B Final, he swam a time of 54.29 placing him 16th overall.  Hargis swam a time of 53.34 in the 100-meter butterfly in the preliminary heats of the men's 4×100-meter medley relay earning him a gold medal.

Coaching
Hargis graduated from Auburn with his Bachelor of Science degree in health promotion and sports management.  From there he began his career as a coach. After college he served as an assistant to the athletic director at Auburn.  Then he coached at University of Nevada, Las Vegas (UNLV) for the 2002-2003 season.  After coaching UNLV for a year, he went on as an assistant for Penn State University, coaching them-to-back to back women's Big Ten Conference championships.  In November 2006 he moved back to Little Rock, Arkansas, to coach his old club team, the Arkansas Dolphins.  Shortly thereafter he was made the head coach of the club as well as the head coach of University of Arkansas, Little Rock. In July 2008, Hargis left his club team to go back to Penn State University where he served as the head coach for five years.  In June 2013 he accepted the associate head coaching position at his alma mater, Auburn University. On April 5, 2016, he was named as the head coach of the swimming and diving team at the University of Pittsburgh.

See also
 List of Auburn University people
 List of Olympic medalists in swimming (men)

References

External links
 
 

1975 births
Living people
American swimming coaches
Auburn Tigers men's swimmers
College swimming coaches in the United States
Olympic gold medalists for the United States in swimming
Penn State Nittany Lions swimming coaches
Pittsburgh Panthers swimming coaches
UNLV Rebels swimming coaches
Little Rock Trojans swimming coaches
People from Clinton, Arkansas
Swimmers at the 1996 Summer Olympics
Medalists at the 1996 Summer Olympics